M. M. Pemasiri Manage is a Sri Lankan politician and a former member of the Parliament of Sri Lanka. A graduated university of ruhuna.he is a teacher ( political science ) He have 3 son.

 Sapumal manage ;  teacher ( maths )
 Prabhashana manage ; politician ( 2018 -   election )- sri lanka's younger politician. ( He got 62% votes - higher score in sri lanka )
 Giwesh manage ; student ( vijitha national school )

References

Year of birth missing (living people)
Living people
Members of the 13th Parliament of Sri Lanka
Janatha Vimukthi Peramuna politicians
United People's Freedom Alliance politicians